Oecanthus exclamationis is a "common tree cricket" in the subfamily Oecanthinae ("tree crickets"). A common name for O. exclamationis is Davis' tree cricket. It is found in North America.

References

Further reading
 
 Field Guide To Grasshoppers, Katydids, And Crickets Of The United States, Capinera, Scott, Walker. 2004. Cornell University Press.
 Otte, Daniel (1994). Crickets (Grylloidea). Orthoptera Species File 1, 120.

External links 

exclamationis 
Orthoptera of North America
Insects described in 1907
Taxa named by William T. Davis